The 9th Gymnasium (Simferopol) or officially Gymnasium No.9 of Simferopol municipality Autonomous Republic of Crimea, is a gymnasium with the profound study of English was organized in 1990 on the basis of a school with a study of a range of subjects in English. It is a general educational institution of academic level, humanities- and linguistics-oriented; it is aimed at a more comprehensive development of the students' intellectual abilities. The school implements differential-individual approach to students.

History 

The school was founded in 1917 and was at the time a private educational institution. It was owned by a married couple of teachers, the Zhirovs, and 20 pupils studied there. Due to certain difficulties, the school was obliged to change its location and move in 1935 to the building of the former gymnasium for girls. In 1934 the school appeared at the exhibition of experimental schools in Moscow, and received a favourable verdict. With the beginning of the Great Patriotic War of 1941–45 many of its teachers and students went to the front. The name of those who died have been immortalized on the commemorative plaque.

Present 

At present, some 770 pupils study in the school. English (profound study), German (second foreign language) and French (optional) are taught. In 2000, the tradition of organizing summer language camps was renewed. Camps like these had been organized in the 1970s on the basis of boarding houses on the southern coast of Crimea. Currently the work of the camps is overseen by native speakers. Students of the gymnasium regularly win I-IV levels of the all-Ukrainian pupil Olympiad in English (IV level - twice). They also make reports at the annual theoretical and practical conferences hosted by the Crimean Institute of Business.

Gymnasium 9 serves a basis for frequent conferences for foreign language teachers organized by the Crimean In-Service Teacher Training Institute (KRIPPO). Teachers of Gymnasium 9 offer demo lessons and workshops for their colleagues.

Since 1999 the Gymnasium has been cooperating with US Peace Corps in Ukraine (teachers Erica Martin in 2000, Alison Stohr in 2007 and Adrianne Kleine in 2010).

Identity 

 Some aspects of English ("Guides and Interpreters") are taught using the gymnasium teachers' own elaborations (author's courses)
 The annual Foreign Language week traditionally ends with a theatrical performance "At the English Fire-place"
 Organizing summer language camps (see)
 Students of the school correspond with Queen Elizabeth II

Principals of the school 
 Sergey Brusentsov
 Petr Medvedev
 Klavdia Lebedeva (1970–1983)
 Liudmila Zginnik (1983–2004)
 Tatiana Koval (2004 —)

See also 

 1st Gymnasium (Simferopol)

References

External links 
 Gymnasium 9 website

Gymnasiums in Ukraine
Buildings and structures in Simferopol
Schools in Crimea
Educational institutions established in 1917
Gymnasiums in Russia
1917 establishments in Russia